Milton John "Skippy" Byrnes (November 15, 1916 – February 1, 1979) was an outfielder in Major League Baseball. He played for the St. Louis Browns from 1943 to 1945.

In three major league seasons, Byrnes posted a .274 batting average (350-for-1278) with 174 runs, 16 home runs, 154 RBI and 199 bases on balls. He finished his career with a .987 fielding percentage playing at all three outfield positions.

References

External links

1916 births
1979 deaths
Major League Baseball outfielders
St. Louis Browns players
Baseball players from Missouri